Brinsfield I Site, or Brinsfield I Prehistoric Village Site, is an archaeological site near Cambridge in Dorchester County, Maryland.  The site was first identified in 1955 by Perry S. Flegel of the Sussex Society of Archaeology & History.  It is a late prehistoric archaeological site characterized by shell-tempered pottery and triangular projectile points.  The site may provide evidence of prehistoric life on the eastern shore of Maryland during the Late Woodland period, c. 900–1500.

It was listed on the National Register of Historic Places in 1975.

References

External links
, including photo from 1974, at Maryland Historical Trust

Archaeological sites in Dorchester County, Maryland
Archaeological sites on the National Register of Historic Places in Maryland
Native American history of Maryland
Late Woodland period
National Register of Historic Places in Dorchester County, Maryland